USS LST-1063 was an  in the United States Navy. Like many of her class, she was not named and is properly referred to by her hull designation.

Construction
She was laid down on 3 January 1945, at Hingham, Massachusetts, by the Bethlehem-Hingham Shipyard; launched on 11 February 1945; and commissioned on 8 March 1945.

Service history
Following World War II, LST-1063 performed occupation duty in the Far East until early April 1946. She was transferred to the Maritime Administration (MARAD) for disposal on 30 June 1948.

Notes

Citations

Bibliography 

Online resources

External links
 

 

LST-542-class tank landing ships
Ships built in Hingham, Massachusetts
1945 ships
World War II amphibious warfare vessels of the United States